"Oh My Love" is a 1971 song by John Lennon.

Oh My Love may also refer to:

"Oh My Love" (The Score song), 2015
Oh My Love (album), a 1994 album by Zard
"Oh My Love", a song by Chris Brown from his 2011 album F.A.M.E.
"Oh My Love", a song by Katyna Ranieri